Ludwik Lawiński (19 June 1887 – 15 September 1971) was a Polish film actor. He appeared in thirteen films between 1927 and 1956.

Filmography

References

External links

1887 births
1971 deaths
Polish male film actors
Polish male silent film actors
Actors from Lviv
20th-century Polish male actors